Mike Smith (born 17 July 1973) is an Australian cricketer. He played in fourteen first-class and sixteen List A matches for South Australia between 1999 and 2003.

See also
 List of South Australian representative cricketers

References

External links
 

1973 births
Living people
Australian cricketers
South Australia cricketers
Cricketers from Adelaide